Snøsporvstranda is a beach at the western part of Kongsøya in Kong Karls Land, Svalbard. It has a length of about six kilometers, and is located south of the mountain Tordenskjoldberget.

References

Landforms of Svalbard
Beaches of Norway
Kongsøya